Lazar Stanišić (born 5 July 1984) is a Serbian footballer who plays as a centre back for Hungarian club DAC 1912 FC.

Career 
Stanišić was born in Vinkovci, SR Croatia, SFR Yugoslavia.

He began his career with FK Mačva Šabac before joining Macedonian club FK Rabotnički in June 2007. After one year with Rabotnicki he moved to FK Vardar.

He left FK Vardar in January 2009 to join Győri ETO FC.

Honours
As player:
FK Rabotnički
Macedonian League:
Winner: 2007-08
Macedonian Cup:
Winner: 2007-08
Győri ETO FC
Hungarian League:
Winner: 2012-13
Hungarian Cup:
Runner-up: 2013
Hungarian SuperCup:
Winner: 2013

References

External links 
Lazar Stanišić at ÖFB

1984 births
Living people
Sportspeople from Vinkovci
Serbs of Croatia
Serbian footballers
Association football defenders
FK Mačva Šabac players
FK Vardar players
FK Rabotnički players
Győri ETO FC players
FC Tatabánya players
SC-ESV Parndorf 1919 players
Nemzeti Bajnokság I players
Serbian expatriate footballers
Expatriate footballers in North Macedonia
Expatriate footballers in Hungary
Expatriate footballers in Austria
Serbian expatriate sportspeople in North Macedonia
Serbian expatriate sportspeople in Hungary
Serbian expatriate sportspeople in Austria